Josef Alois Knittel (20 April 1814, Oberbach – 23 December 1875, Freiburg im Breisgau) was an Austrian-born German sculptor. On his mother's side, he was a nephew of the painter, Joseph Anton Koch; on his father's side, an uncle of Anna Stainer-Knittel. His sons,  and  also became sculptors.

Biography 

His father was a master tailor. He displayed an early talent for art, which prompted his drawing teacher, to suggest that he be sent to Munich for further studies. In 1835, he enrolled at the Academy of Fine Arts there; becoming a student of Ludwig Schwanthaler and Peter von Cornelius. 

He completed his studies in 1838, and settled in Munich. In 1847, he moved to Freiburg, where he would live for the rest of his life. The following year, he married Thekla Geiges (1836-1898); daughter of the District Auditor, Anton Geiges, and sister of the city's Master Builder, . He was godfather to his nephew, who would become a glass painter.  

Kopf would later create works from Knittel's original models. His niece, Anna, came to him in 1867, seeking his support for her proposed marriage, which her father was trying to prevent.

He was awarded a major commission by Mayor Carl Röttinger to create four statues, depicting the seasons, for the grounds of the Freiburg railway station. He had barely completed the preliminary sketches when he died of heart failure. His widow and two sons continued to operate his studio for many years.

Most of his work was done in sandstone. His best known work is the monument to Berthold Schwarz, the alchemist credited with inventing gunpowder, on the Freiburg town square. Several works, including a large statue of Albert VI, Archduke of Austria, were destroyed during World War II. Statues representing Theory and Technology, on the old Realschule, were demolished during construction of the University Library in 1978, as they had been damaged during the war.

References

Further reading 
 Alfred Biehler: "Der Großvater: Bildhauer Josef Alois Knittel". In: Heinz Spath: Bildhauer Hugo Knittel, 1957
 Eva Boehm: Das Werk des Bildhauers Alois Knittel – Möglichkeiten der Thematisierung im Unterricht der Realschule, thesis, Pädagogischen Hochschule Freiburg, 1998, Online
 Michael Klant: "Die Künstlerfamilie Knittel", In: Skulptur in Freiburg. Kunst des 19. Jahrhunderts im öffentlichen Raum, Vol.2. Modo, 2000, pp.173–180

External links 

German sculptors
1814 births
1875 deaths
Academy of Fine Arts, Munich alumni
People from Reutte District